Arinola Olasumbo Sanya (born 1953) is a Nigerian professor of physiotherapy at the University of Ibadan and a former commissioner of health in Oyo State, Nigeria. Arinola was appointed professor in 2000, making her the first female professor of physiotherapy in Africa, and the second ever professor of physiotherapy in Nigeria. She is among the Notable Oyo State indigenes.

Arinola is the current Deputy Vice-Chancellor (Administration) at the University of Ibadan. Arinola attended Salvation Army Primary School in Surulere Lagos. Upon Completion, she attended Queens College, Yaba, Lagos where she was made Head Girl. She trained as a Physiotherapist at the University of Ibadan, the Premier Physiotherapy Training Institution South of the Sahara. She joined the Department of Physiotherapy at the University of Ibadan as a graduate assistant in 1978 where she remains as professor. Arinola is a Consultant Physiotherapist to the University College Hospital (UCH), Ibadan. She sits on several management level committees at the University of Ibadan such as the Appointments and Promotions Committee.

Public service

She was appointed commissioner for health in Oyo State (Nigeria) in 2005.

Family

Professor Sanya is married to Dr. Yemi Sanya, a pharmacist and a business magnate in Lagos, Nigeria. They have four children.

Publications

 Physical treatment of Buruli (Mycobacterial) ulceration in Nigeria: a case study report
 Constraint - Induced Movement Therapy: Determinants and Correlates of Duration of Adherence to Restraint use Among Stroke Survivors with Hemiparesis
 Risk factors for low back pain among hospital workers in Ibadan, Oyo State, Nigeria

External links

 https://www.researchgate.net/profile/Arinola-Sanya
 https://www.ui.edu.ng/content/citation-professor-arinola-olasumbo-sanya
 https://www.wikidata.org/wiki/Q4790728

References

1953 births
Living people
Yoruba women academics
People from Lagos
University of Ibadan alumni
Academic staff of the University of Ibadan
Queen's College, Lagos alumni
Nigerian women academics
Nigerian medical researchers
Nigerian physiotherapists
 Yoruba people
Residents of Lagos